Julie and Me is a Canadian lesbian romantic comedy film, directed by Jeanne Crépeau and released in 1998. The film's French title translates literally as "See Julie Again".

Plot

The film takes place mainly over two days. Following a recent break-up, Juliet makes a to-do list, which includes seeing her former friend Julie again for the first time in 15 years.

Juliet tracks Julie down in the Eastern Townships of Quebec. Day 1 sees the pair reconnect as they spend the day together. However, near the end of the night, Juliet kisses Julie. Surprised, despite a similar incident in their adolescence, Julie initially rejects Juliet.  However, the next day when Juliet prepares to leave, Julie won't let her go.

Day 2 sees Julie work through her feelings for Juliet.  Facing the prospect of losing Juliet again, Julie finally admits to having feelings for Juliet and eventually returns Juliet's affections.

Cast
Dominique Leduc as Julie
Stephanie Morgenstern as Juliet
Lucille Belair as Aunt Maggie
Muriel Dutil as Julies Mother
Marcel Sabourin as Mr Provencher
Marie-Pierre Côté as Young Juliet
Mariève Deslongchamps as Young Julie

Awards
The film won the Audience Award at the Paris Lesbian Film Festival in 1999.

See also 
 List of LGBT films directed by women

References

External links

1998 films
1990s French-language films
Canadian romantic comedy films
Lesbian-related films
Canadian LGBT-related films
1998 LGBT-related films
LGBT-related romantic comedy films
1998 romantic comedy films
French-language Canadian films
1990s Canadian films